Papyrus Oxyrhynchus 32 (P. Oxy. 32) is a letter to a tribunus militum, written in Latin. It was discovered by Grenfell and Hunt in 1897 in Oxyrhynchus. The fragment is dated to the second century. It is housed in the Bodleian Library. The text was published by Grenfell and Hunt in 1898.

The letter was written to Julius Domitius, military tribune of the legion, by Aurelius Archelaus.

The manuscript was written on papyrus in the form of a sheet. The measurements of the fragment are 196 by 105 mm. The text is written in a cursive hand. The writing is very clear and easy to decipher.

See also 
 Oxyrhynchus Papyri
 Papyrus Oxyrhynchus 31
 Papyrus Oxyrhynchus 33

References 

032
2nd-century manuscripts